Vaasa Airport  is located in Vaasa, Finland, about  south-east of Vaasa city centre. As of 2021, it is the 9th busiest airport in Finland with 19,231 passengers.

Regular airlines at Vaasa airport are Finnair and Scandinavian Airlines. The airport is also served by several charters with destinations to Bulgaria, Canary Islands, Greece, Spain and Turkey.

History
The airport was opened in 1938 when Aero began passenger traffic, which was later interrupted by the war. In 1945 the airport building was completed and passenger routes were reopened.

The airport took its current shape in the 1950s, when the runway was extended to 1,800 metres and the airport building was expanded. In 1951 Vaasa Airport got its first international connection as Veljekset Karhumäki opened a route to Sundsvall in Sweden. In 1971 the runway was extended to 2,000 metres and Finnair began jet traffic with DC-9 aircraft.

In 1993 the third and most significant expansion at the airport was completed, with the airport getting separate facilities for domestic and international traffic and with a significant improvement of the airport's services. In 1998 Vaasa Airport took a step towards more international aviation, as the runway was extended to 2,500 metres in October. In 2014 the terminal's renovation was completed: a new baggage claim hall, security control rearrangement, another café and a new store.

In 2005, 2008, and once again in 2017 Vaasa Airport was chosen as the Airport of the Year in Finland.

The remains of the decommissioned 11/29 1,500m asphalt runway exist towards the south-west of the aerodrome.

Airlines and destinations

Passenger statistics

Ground transportation

See also 
List of the largest airports in the Nordic countries

References

External links

 Finavia – Vaasa Airport
 AIP Finland – Vaasa Airport
 
 
 

Airports in Finland
Airport
Buildings and structures in Ostrobothnia (region)
International airports in Finland